This is a list of fictional schools as portrayed in various media.

Literature

 Camden College
 Chalet School, in books by Elinor Brent-Dyer
 Greyfriars School, in books by Charles Hamilton writing as Frank Richards
 The Little Female Academy, in Sarah Fielding's 1754 book.
 Lowood Institution, in Jane Eyre by Charlotte Brontë
 Malory Towers, in books by Enid Blyton
 Miskatonic University
 St Trinian's School, in comic books by Ronald Searle and later films
 Sweet Valley High
 Redmond College, in Lucy Maud Montgomery's series of works related to Anne of Green Gables

Comics
 Hudson University

Film
 Monsters University

Television

 Ackley Bridge College in Channel 4's television drama series, Ackley Bridge, set in the fictional Yorkshire mill town of Ackley Bridge
 For-Profit Online University
 Grange Hill School in BBC's television drama series, Grange Hill, set in the fictional North London borough of Northam
 Hudson University
 Mars University, Futurama
 Pembroke University, a small university "in what seems like New England", the setting for 2021 Netflix series The Chair

Others
 Starfleet Academy, located in San Francisco, California in the fictional Star Trek universe.

Magic schools

A magic school is an institution for learning magic, appearing in works of fantasy depicting worlds in which magic exists and in which there is an organized society of magicians or wizards who pass on their knowledge systematically. It may also be a school that is magically protected or a Faculty of Magic in a university which also teaches other subjects. More loosely, also a place where a single wizard teaches an apprentice can count as a magic school.

Folklore 
 The Black School, where the Icelandic priest and scholar Sæmundr fróði supposedly learned magic from the Devil
 Domdaniel
 The Cave at Salamanca where the Devil supposedly taught, among others, Pope Sylvester II
 The Scholomance, a legendary school of black magic in Transylvania

In a series
Dungeons and Dragons

 Arcanix in Aundair from the Eberron campaign setting
Morgrave University in Sharn from the Eberron campaign setting
Soltryce Academy in Rexxentrum, the capital of the Dwendalian Empire, from the Wildemount campaign setting; premiered in Critical Role's second campaign
Sorcere, part of the academy of Menzoberranzan, where drow mages learn magic; from the Forgotten Realms campaign setting
Strixhaven, a magical university located in the plane of Arcavios from the Magic: The Gathering multiverse
Harry Potter series 

 Hogwarts School of Witchcraft and Wizardry in Scotland
 Beauxbatons Academy of Magic in France
 Durmstrang Institute for Magical Learning between the border of Norway and Sweden
 Ilvermorny School of Witchcraft and Wizardry in North America
 Uagadou in Africa
 Mahoutokoro in Japan
 Castelobruxo (pronounced cah-stelo-bru-sho) Amazon rainforest in Brazil
 Koldovstoretz in Russia

Others
 Balamb Garden, a magic school featured in Final Fantasy VIII. Other "gardens" in this game include Galbadia Garden and Trabia Garden.
 The School of Magic on Roke Island from Ursula K. LeGuin's Earthsea cycle
 Unseen University in the Discworld books of Terry Pratchett
 Wizard's Hall, in the eponymous novel by Jane Yolen
 University of Salamanca Faculty of Magic in The Charwoman's Shadow by Lord Dunsany

See also
 List of fictional British and Irish universities

References

Citations

Sources

 
 
 
 
 
 

 
Schools